This is a list of episodes for the tenth season (1995–96) of the television series Married... with Children.

The tenth season had the death of family pet Buck and his subsequent reincarnation into the body of Lucky, the Bundys' next dog. The season also marks the first appearances of Peggy's father Ephraim (played by Tim Conway) and Peggy's mother, who moves in with the Bundys (although she is never seen, only heard). Also, Peg leaves Al and goes on a search for her father.

Katey Sagal missed seven episodes and made short appearances in three episodes. Amanda Bearse also missed three episodes.

Episode 22 "Enemies" was a back-door spin-off pilot that was not picked up.

Episodes

References

1995 American television seasons
1996 American television seasons
10